Total communication (TC) is an approach to communicating that aims to make use of a number of modes of communication such as signed, oral, auditory, written and visual aids, depending on the particular needs and abilities of the person.

History
The term "Total Communication" and its specific philosophy were first used by Roy Holcomb in California. It was adopted by the Maryland school as the official name for their educational philosophy. TC was supposed to find a middle ground in age-old disputes between oralism and manualism, and as an alternative to simultaneous communication. In practice, however, most total communication programs use some form of simultaneous communication.

See also
 Bilingual-bicultural education

References

 Lowenbraun, S., Appelman, K., & Callahan, J. (1980). Teaching the hearing impaired through total communication. Columbus, OH: Charles E. Merrill.
 Mayer, P. & Lowenbraun, S. (1990). Total communication use among elementary teachers of hearing-impaired children. American Annals of the Deaf, 135, 257–263.
 Moores, D. F. (1996). Educating the deaf. Boston: Houghton Mifflin Co.
 Schlesinger, H. (1986). "Total communication in perspective". In D. M. Luterman (Ed.), Deafness in Perspective (pp. 87–116). College-Hill Press: San Diego, CA.
 Scouten, E. (1984). Turning points in the education of deaf people. Danville, IL: The Interstate Printers and Publishers, Inc.

External links
 Total Communication- The ERIC Clearinghouse on Disabilities and Gifted Education, USA.
 Interview with David Denton

Augmentative and alternative communication